The 1915 Kendall Orange and Black football team represented Henry Kendall College (later renamed the University of Tulsa) during the 1915 college football season. In their third year under head coach Sam P. McBirney, the Orange and Black compiled a 6–1–1 record and outscored their opponents by a total of 257 to 33. The team played Oklahoma A&M to a scoreless tie and lost a close game to Oklahoma by a score of 14–13.

Schedule

References

Kendall
Tulsa Golden Hurricane football seasons
Kendall Orange and Black football